Bothriembryon sophiarum is a species of tropical air-breathing land snails, terrestrial pulmonate gastropod mollusc in the family Bothriembryontidae. This species is endemic to Australia.

The anatomy of a reproductive system of this species was visualized by micro–computed tomography scanner (without dissection) and used in a species description of a land snail for the first time.

References

Bothriembryontidae
Gastropods described in 2016